Uncial 0320 (in the Gregory-Aland numbering), is a diglot Greek-Latin uncial manuscript of the New Testament on parchment. Palaeographically it has been assigned to the 10th-century. Formerly it was designated by Dabs2. The manuscript is very lacunose.

It is particularly notable as one of the two such copies which display clear evidence of having had Claromontanus as exemplar.

Description 

The codex contains a small texts of the Epistle to the Ephesians 1:3–9; 2:11–18, on six parchment leaves of size . The text is written in one column per page, 42 lines per page.

The Greek text of the codex is a representative of the Western text-type. Kurt Aland placed it in Category III (Aland's Profile 1391 301/2 442 35S).

History 

Currently it is dated by the INTF to the 10th-century.

It is currently housed at the Hessisches Staatsarchiv Marburg (Best. 147 Hr. 2 Nr. 2, 6 fol.).

See also 

 List of New Testament uncials
 Biblical manuscript
 Textual criticism

References

External links 
 "Continuation of the Manuscript List", Institute for New Testament Textual Research, University of Münster. Retrieved September 8, 2009
 Viktor Schultze,  "Codex Waldeccensis (Dw Paul): unbekannte Fragmente einer Griechisch-Lateinischen Bibelhandschrift", C.H. Becksche, 1904. [a facsimile of Uncial 0320]
 E. Nestle, Zwei griechisch-lateinische Handschriften des Neuen Testaments, ZNW, Giessen 1907, p. 239.

Greek New Testament uncials
10th-century biblical manuscripts